Delphinonaias is a genus of freshwater mussels, aquatic bivalve mollusks in the subfamily Ambleminae  of the family Unionidae.

Distribution
Species in this freshwater genus are found in Guatemala.

Species
Species within the genus Cyrtonaias include: 
 Delphinonaias largillierti (Philippi, 1847)
 Delphinonaias scutulata (Morelet, 1849)

Species brought into synonymy
 Delphinonaias delphinula (Morelet, 1849): synonym of Delphinonaias largillierti (Philippi, 1847) (a junior synonym)

References

 Morelet, A., 1849 - Testacea novissima insulae cubanae et americae centralis, Pars 1, p. 31 pp

External links
 Fischer P. & Crosse H. (1870-1902). Études sur les mollusques terrestres et fluviatiles du Mexique et du Guatemala. Mission scientifique au Mexique et dans l'Amerique Centrale. Recherches zoologiques, Partie 7 Volume 1: 702 pp., pls 1-31; volume 2: 731 pp., pls 32-72. Paris: Imprimerie Nationale. Published in 17 livraisons
 Graf, D.; Cummings, K. (2019). Mussels database: The Freshwater Mussels (Unionoida) of the World (and other less consequential bivalves)
 MNHN, Paris: syntype

Unionidae
Bivalve genera